George Whitaker (25 August 1864 – 23 August 1937) was a British sport shooter who competed at the 1908, 1912 and 1920 Summer Olympics.

At the 1908 Olympics he won a bronze medal in the team trap shooting event and was 11th in the individual trap shooting event. Four years later, he won a silver medal in the team clay pigeons event and was 29th in the trap event.

References

External links
George Whitaker's profile at databaseOlympics

1864 births
1937 deaths
British male sport shooters
Olympic shooters of Great Britain
Shooters at the 1908 Summer Olympics
Shooters at the 1912 Summer Olympics
Shooters at the 1920 Summer Olympics
Olympic silver medallists for Great Britain
Olympic bronze medallists for Great Britain
Olympic medalists in shooting
Medalists at the 1908 Summer Olympics
Medalists at the 1912 Summer Olympics